Taht may refer to:
 Thoth, an ancient Egyptian deity
 Taht, Bayburt, a village in Turkey
 Robert Täht, Estonian volleyball player

See also 
 
 Takht (disambiguation)
 Tahat (disambiguation)